

Haiti
 Jean Ambrose – Bordeaux – 2015–16
 Carlens Arcus – Troyes, Lille OSC – 2015–17
 Ernst Atis-Clotaire – AS Monaco – 1995–96
 Hervé Bazile – Caen – 2014–18
 Jean-Ricner Bellegarde – Strasbourg – 2019–
 Wagneau Eloi – Lens, AS Nancy, AS Monaco, Guingamp – 1993–95, 1996–01, 2002–04
 Romain Genevois – Nice, Caen – 2012–19
 Dany Jean – Strasbourg – 2022–
 Claudel Legros – Angoulême – 1969–70 (fr)
 Jeff Louis – Nancy, Caen – 2012–13, 2015–18
 Jean-Eudes Maurice – Paris SG – 2009–12
 Wilner Nazaire – Valenciennes – 1972–73, 1975–76
 Jean-Jacques Pierre – Nantes – 2005–07, 2008–09
 Johny Placide – Le Havre, Reims – 2009, 2013-16

Honduras
Porfirio Armando Betancourt – Strasbourg – 1982–84
Alberth Elis – Bordeaux, Brest – 2021–
Georgie Welcome – Monaco – 2010–11

Hungary
 János Aknai – Red Star – 1935–36
 László Bálint – Toulouse FC – 1982–83
 Sándor Barna – Montpellier – 1934–35
 Arpad Belko – Antibes, Sochaux – 1932–38
 Gyula Beretvás – Olympique Lillois – 1933–35
 Elemér Berkessy – RC Paris – 1932–34
 Lájos Blaskó – Valenciennes – 1937–38
 György Bobik – Marseille – 1958–59
 György Bognár – Toulon – 1988–91
 Miklos Boros – Club Français – 1932–33
 Márton Bukovi – Sète – 1933–35
 Gyozo Burcsa – Auxerre – 1985–87
 Károly Csapó – Toulouse FC – 1982–83
 Joan Csintalan – Stade Français – 1948–49
 Imre Danko – Lens – 1949–50
 József Ébner – Montpellier – 1934–35
 József Eisenhoffer – Marseille – 1932–38
 Mihály Eőry – Sète – 1934–35
 Károly Finta – Fives – 1938–39
 Vilmos Frayt – CA Paris – 1932–33
 Jozsef Frivaldi – Rouen – 1962–63
 József Gergely – Sète – 1934–35
 Imre Grünbaum – Antibes – 1935–36
 Béla Guttmann – Metz – 1932–33
 István Gyulai – Rennes – 1936–37
 Péter Hannich – AS Nancy – 1986–87
 Béla Havas – Nice – 1932–33
 Belá Herczeg – Montpellier, Alès, Sochaux – 1934–36, 1938–39
 Szabolcs Huszti – Metz – 2005–06
 Sándor Janda-Friedmann – Mulhouse – 1932–33
 Ladislas Kalix – Montpellier, Nice, SC Nîmes – 1932–35
 Jenő Kálmár – Excelsior Roubaix, RC Roubaix – 1933–37
 Géza Kalocsay – Olympique Lillois – 1937–39
 László Kapta – Fives – 1937–39
 László Klausz – Sochaux – 1998–99
 Rezső Kohut – Marseille – 1933–34
 Vilmos Kohut – Marseille – 1933–39
 Mátyás Korányi – Olympique Lillois – 1937–39
 Kálmán Kovács – Auxerre, Valenciennes – 1989–91, 1992–93
 Karoly Kovács – Antibes, Cannes – 1933–39
 János Köves – Cannes – 1932–34
 Attila Ladinsky – Valenciennes – 1979–80
 Ádám Lang – Dijon – 2016–18
 Hermann Leitner – Sète – 1932–33
 Miklós Lendvai – Bordeaux – 1996–97
 Barna Liebháber – Angoulême – 1969–70
 István Lukács – Sète, Olympique Lillois – 1933–36
 Rezső Lyka – Nice – 1932–33
 Imre Markos – Rennes – 1936–37
 Gábor Márton – Cannes – 1993–94
 Ferenc Mayer – CA Paris, Strasbourg – 1932–34, 1936–38
 Istvan Mester – Marseille – 1935–37
 Géza Mészöly – Le Havre, Lille OSC – 1993–95, 1995–97
 János Móré – Olympique Lillois – 1936–39
 Andrej Prean Nagy – Cannes, Marseille, Strasbourg – 1946–52
 Antal Nagy – Marseille – 1972–73
 Antal Nagy – AS Nancy – 1986–87
 Gyula Nagy – CO Roubaix-Tourcoing, Colmar, Sète, Alès, Metz – 1947–49, 1951–53, 1957–59, 1961–62
 János Nagy – Cannes, RC Roubaix – 1932–34, 1936–39
 József Nehadoma – Mulhouse – 1932–33, 1936–37
 György Nemes – Sète – 1946–48
 Ernö Nemeth – Montpellier, RC Roubaix – 1932–35, 1936–37
 Ferenc Niko – RC Paris – 1932–33
 Ferenc Nyers – Strasbourg, Saint-Étienne – 1946–48, 1952–55, 1957–59
 István Nyers – Stade Français – 1946–48
 Ferenc Odry – Saint-Étienne – 1938–39
 Franz Platko – Mulhouse – 1932–33
 Ouduch Pybert – Alès, Valenciennes – 1934–36, 1937–38
 Gergely Rudolf – AS Nancy – 2005–07
 Károly Sas – Red Star, Marseille – 1934–37
 István Schubert –  Nice, Cannes – 1933–35
 Imre Sepers – Antibes – 1932–33
 Vilmos Šipoš – Sète – 1937–38
 Lehel Somlai – Le Havre – 1960–61
 Rezső Somlai – Nice, Alès, Red Star – 1932–34, 1935–37
 Jenö Stern – CA Paris – 1933–34
 László Sternberg – Red Star – 1936–37
 György Swarek Sarvari – Montpellier – 1932–33
 Geza Szabó – Olympique Lillois, Rouen – 1937–39
 János Szabó – Sochaux – 1934–39
 Zoltán Szélesi – Strasbourg – 2007–08
 János Szemán – Cannes – 1932–33
 László Szőke – RC Paris – 1951–52
 Andras Janos Toth – Strasbourg – 1950–51
 Mihály Tóth – Metz – 1998–99
 István Turbéky – Bordeaux – 1952–54
 Jozsef Vago – Valenciennes, RC Roubaix – 1937–39
 Béla Várady – Tours – 1984–85
 Gyorgy Varga – Montpellier – 1932–35
 Zoltán Varga – Olympique Lillois – 1932–34
 Gyula Vastag – Metz – 1946–47
 Lajos Weber – CA Paris – 1932–33
 Gyula Weinstock – CA Paris – 1933–34
 Istvan Závodi-Zavadszky – Montpellier – 1932–35, 1946–47
 Pál Zilahi – Alès – 1934–35
 Jozsef Zsamboki – Strasbourg – 1961–65

References and notes

Books

Club pages
AJ Auxerre former players
AJ Auxerre former players
Girondins de Bordeaux former players
Girondins de Bordeaux former players
Les ex-Tangos (joueurs), Stade Lavallois former players
Olympique Lyonnais former players
Olympique de Marseille former players
FC Metz former players
AS Monaco FC former players
Ils ont porté les couleurs de la Paillade... Montpellier HSC Former players
AS Nancy former players
FC Nantes former players
Paris SG former players
Red Star Former players
Red Star former players
Stade de Reims former players
Stade Rennais former players
CO Roubaix-Tourcoing former players
AS Saint-Étienne former players
Sporting Toulon Var former players

Others

stat2foot
footballenfrance
French Clubs' Players in European Cups 1955-1995, RSSSF
Finnish players abroad, RSSSF
Italian players abroad, RSSSF
Romanians who played in foreign championships
Swiss players in France, RSSSF
EURO 2008 CONNECTIONS: FRANCE, Stephen Byrne Bristol Rovers official site

Notes

France
 
Association football player non-biographical articles